The Polish Roman Catholic Union of America ("PRCUA") (pol. Zjednoczenie Polskie Rzymsko-Katolickie w Ameryce) is the oldest Polish American organization in the United States.  Currently licensed to sell its products in 27 states, it is a fraternal benefit society providing financial security to its members through competitive life insurance and annuities, and offering opportunities for cultural, educational and spiritual growth.

History
The Polish Roman Catholic Union of America traces its existence to 1873. In June of that year, Father Theodor Gieryk of Detroit wrote letters to Polish-language newspapers urging the creation of a Polish-American national organization. On October 3, 1873 a group of influential Polish Americans met and established the PRCUA. Among these founders were Father Vincent Barzynski, influential pastor of Saint Stanislaus Kostka in Chicago and Father Leopold Moczygemba, founder of America's first Polish settlement in Panna Maria, Texas. The new organization's stated goals were:

 to build Polish churches and schools
 to promote adherence to the Roman Catholic religion, and the religious and cultural traditions of the Polish nation
 to give fraternal assistance to Poles
 to take care of widows and orphans
 to help Poland to become an independent country again
 to establish the newspaper Pielgrzym as the official organ of the organization

From the time when many Polish Americans were disenchanted with the American Catholic hierarchy's preponderance of Irish and German bishops, the PRCUA's history spans notable periods in the development of the Polish American ethnic group, from the time of early settlement by immigrants from Poland (Poles) through their development of ethnic identity, to their dual struggles in support of Poland's independence and to find their place in American society.

Contention with the Polish National Alliance
Before the First World War, the PRCUA often found itself at odds with the Polish National Alliance, a fraternal organization founded in 1880. The basic outward differences between the two fraternals are often remarked. The PRCUA, earlier and more conservative, tended to support the American Catholic hierarchy over lay groups such as parish councils. The younger PNA was more radical in outlook and generally championed lay leadership over the Church hierarchy. However, more important difference was that of world view.

The PRCUA viewed the Polish American community in terms of okolica, or "local environment," which it viewed as the starting point for building cultural awareness. The PNA viewed the Polish American community in terms of naród, which was constituted by the entire Polish people, at home and abroad, and took as its ultimate goal the reconstitution of divided Poland. The two fraternals were able to reconcile their differences during the twentieth century and have coexisted amicably for decades.

Newspaper and current activities
In 1886 the Pielgrzym was replaced by the weekly Gazeta Katolicka and in 1897 by the Naród Polski. The Naród Polski became a semi-monthly publication in 1946.  The Naród Polski is the official publication of the PRCUA. Today, the Naród Polski is published monthly and contains both Polish and English articles in each issue. An online version is also available to subscribers.

At present, PRCUA has developed into a fraternal benefit society that performs religious, charitable, educational and civic work on behalf of its members and the Polish American Community.  Members join PRCUA primarily by purchasing life insurance and/or annuity certificates from the organization.  Members participate in activities such as folk dancing and singing, language classes, crafts, and youth festivals through local lodges. PRCUA also extends residential mortgage loans to its members.

In addition, PRCUA is the principal patron of the Polish Museum of America, the largest ethnic museum in America located in Chicago, Illinois. The PRCUA's Home Office is located in Chicago, IL. This historic 1913 building (listed on the National Register of Historic Places in 2013) houses The Polish Museum of America (established in 1935) and its Library (which celebrated its 100th Anniversary on April 18, 2015).

Administration (2018-2022) 
The organization's current Officers are:

James J. Robaczewski, ALMI, FIC - National President
Micheline I. Jaminski - National Vice President
Agnieszka J. Bastrzyk, ALMI, FICF - National Secretary-Treasurer

See also
Peter Kiołbassa (1837-1905) Polonia activist and Democratic politician in the City of Chicago who helped organize St. Stanislaus Kostka Parish

References

External links
Polish Roman Catholic Union of America website

Religious organizations established in 1873
History of Catholicism in the United States
Polish-American culture in Chicago
Religious organizations based in Chicago
Ethnic fraternal orders in the United States
Polish-American organizations
Catholic fraternal orders